Lars Gårding (7 March 1919 – 7 July 2014) was a Swedish mathematician. He made notable contributions to the study of partial differential equations and partial differential operators. He was a professor of mathematics at Lund University in Sweden 1952–1984. Together with Marcel Riesz, he was a thesis advisor for Lars Hörmander.

Biography
Gårding was born in Hedemora, Sweden but grew up in Motala, where his father was an engineer at the plant. He began to study mathematics in Lund in 1937 with the first intention of becoming an actuary.

His doctorate thesis, which was written under supervision of Marcel Riesz, was first on group representations in 1944, but in the following years he changed his research focus to the theory of partial differential equations.  He held the professorship of mathematics at Lund University from 1952 until retirement in 1984.

His interest was not limited to mathematics, but also in art, literature and music. He played the violin and the piano. Further, he published a book on bird songs and calls in 1987, a result of his interest in bird watching.

Gårding was elected a member of the Royal Swedish Academy of Sciences in 1953.

Gårding died on 7 July 2014, aged 95.

Selected works
Books
 1977. Encounter with Mathematics, 1st Edition.
 2013. Encounter with Mathematics, softcover reprint of the 1st 1977 edition. Springer

Articles

References

External links

1919 births
2014 deaths
20th-century Swedish mathematicians
People connected to Lund University
Members of the Royal Swedish Academy of Sciences
PDE theorists